Ariann Black (also spelled Arian Black earlier in her career) is a magician based in Las Vegas, Nevada. She has headlined her own show in Vegas and appeared on a number of national and international television shows. She is known in the magic world for her efforts to encourage and promote other female performers. She was voted Female Magician of the Year in 2004 and International Female Magician of the Year in 2008 & 2009. most recently Ariann was awarded "Magician of the Year by the International Conclave of Illusionists. 

Black was born in Canada and began doing magic when she was five years old. She turned professional when she was 19 and moved to New York, where she ended up working at the Trump Plaza and Trump's Castle in Atlantic City. That led to various international work and after several years she settled in Las Vegas. 

In Vegas she has headlined her own magic show Secrets, which first played at the Fitzgerald's Hotel and Casino. A new larger version of Secrets opened at the Westin Hotel Casino in 2010. Ariann has also appeared in a number of other shows in major venues, such as Splash at the Riveria Hotel and Casino. In 2008, she was the opening act for The Amazing Jonathan. She also does a large amount of corporate work. 

On television she has been seen in two episodes of Steve Harvey's Big Time on the WB network. She has also appeared on an Animal Planet special with Lance Burton. She has appeared in BBC shows, and series for French and Italian networks and for the Canadian network CBC. She made her last TV appearance on Pawn Stars in 2014. 

Black studied with the late Doug Henning. She also has a qualification in magic having studied with Dale Salwack at the Chavez School of Magic.

References

Further reading
 Jaq Greenspon, "Magic Divas", MAGIC Magazine, (March 2006)
 John Moehring, "Arian Black at Fitzgeralds", MAGIC Magazine, (January 2003)
 "Arian Black: feature", Magic Magazine, (1992 No.7), p. 20

External links
 http://www.arianblack.com
 https://web.archive.org/web/20110130185640/http://secretslv.com/

 Article in the Las Vegas Sun
 The ''* M.U.M. Magazine article about the All Girl Gala organised by Arian at the Society of American Magicians Convention.
  Female Magic Show LV Sun article
  Charity Show LV Sun article
  Arian Black in Secrets LV Sun story photo
  Arian Black LV Sun story photo
  Arian in Secrets LV Sun story photo
  Arian Black on "Steve Harvey's BigTime." YouTube

Canadian magicians
American magicians
Living people
Year of birth missing (living people)
Female magicians
America's Got Talent contestants